Inha University Station is a metro station on the Suin Line as part of the Seoul Metropolitan Subway that opened on February 27, 2016. It is right next to Inha University and a large Home Plus mall, along with new large apartment complexes.

It was an abandoned railway station as Yonghyeon Station. It opened in 1965 and closed in the 1970s.

References

Metro stations in Incheon
Railway stations opened in 2016
Seoul Metropolitan Subway stations
Michuhol District